Balliol College Boat Club (BCBC) is the rowing club for members of Balliol College, Oxford, England. It is one of the college boat clubs at the University of Oxford.

Balliol College Boat Club competes in rowing regattas organised by Oxford University Rowing Clubs, including Torpids and Summer Eights, as well as external regattas such as Marlow Regatta and Henley Royal Regatta.

History

The Balliol College Archives have much material concerning the Boat Club from about 1840 onwards. The College Buttery has an extensive collection of sports photographs and trophies including many to do with the Boat Club. Although it is questioned whether an official boat club existed until the 1850s.

The base of the Boat Club for the latter part of the 19th century and much of the 20th century was a grand barge, which was moored on the River Thames at the south side of Christ Church Meadow. The barge was bought from the Skinners' Company in 1859. The present boathouse (semi-detached, with New College occupying the other half) was opened in May 1959. The barge was on view in 1996 at Henley, when it was up for auction.

The first recorded headship by Balliol College was in 1851, bumping Wadham College on the first day, and later they reclaimed headship in 1855 on the seventh night after bumping Brasenose College. The College has been Head of the River in the Summer Eights many times, notably a longish run in the 1950s and also regaining the Headship in 2008. Balliol's previous last reign at the Head of the River was when they were head of Torpids for three consecutive years (1968–71).

At Henley Royal Regatta, Balliol has won the following events:
 Ladies' Challenge Plate – 1855, 1858, 1890, 1891
 Visitors' Challenge Cup – 1899, 1901
 Silver Goblets – 1851, 1857, 1859
 Diamond Challenge Sculls – 1902

At the 1975 British Rowing Championships, Balliol won the lightweight men's quad sculls.

Alumni
Famous Balliol oarsmen have included Lord Justice Chitty, Edmond Warre (Head Master of Eton), Frederick Septimus Kelly (composer, killed in France 1916: considered one of the greatest oarsmen of all time having won at least one event at Henley Royal Regatta each year from 1902–1906 and Olympic gold in 1908), Cardinal Heard, Dan Snow (three time 'Blue' and 2001 OUBC president), HM King Olav V of Norway and HM King Harald V of Norway (who was taught to row by fellow student Nick Bevan, later a rowing coach).

Rivalries
Not having traditionally been a "rowing college" over much of the 20th century, Balliol College has few rivalries with other Oxford colleges. 
However, the Balliol/Trinity rivalry, which exists in other facets of college life, is felt more recently, as Trinity has caught up with Balliol in Summer VIII's, and Balliol has defeated Trinity to claim victory in Christ Church Regatta in 2013.

Recent form

In 2008, Balliol's Men regained the Head of the River in the Oxford Summer Eights competition, the first time in 52 years. In 2010 and 2011, the College's women were placed "Head of the River" in the Summer Eights, the first time in recent decades. The club has a history of developing new talent, and the club's lower boats have also performed very well in recent years. The combined efforts of the more experienced oarsmen and a talented crop of novices helped BCBC to top the bumps charts for both Torpids and Summer Eights in 2008 and 2009. The BCBC Torpids campaign of 2008 was the most successful campaign by an Oxford University college on record,  with the five crews entered by Balliol College Boat Club bumping on average 5.4 times over the four days of racing.

Following this success in the first decade of the new millennium, both sides of the boat club have slipped down the rankings but remain very competitive in division 1. As at 2020, the Men's First VIII was 7th on the river, and the Women's First VIII placed 11th for Summer Eights.

Eights headships
 Men: 1851, 1855, 1859, 1860, 1873, 1879, 1952, 1955, 1956, 2008
 Women: 2010, 2011

Torpids headships
 Men: 1897–99, 1911, 1928, 1929, 1954, 1968–71

Organisation
The boat club is governed by a committee consisting of student representatives and an overseeing Senior Member (currently Professor Robin Chowdhury). All are unelected, or elected by the previous committee, and volunteer their time to the club.

Coaching
2002/21 Season: Men's 1st VIII is coached by Natalie Holden; The Women's 1st VIII 

Previous Coaches have included George New and Nick Bevan, who attended Balliol in 1960 and has had a long history in rowing coaching at school level. He was originally approached by Balliol to help coach the Men's 1st and 2nd VIIIs but found a home with the Women of Balliol.

Equipment
BCBC has greatly benefited from the generous donations of old Balliolites over the years. The current men's and women's first boats, the 'Beeland Rogers' and the 'Happy Rogers' respectively, reflect this trend. Beeland Rogers is a R86 Empacher while Happy Rogers is a more standard lightweight K series boat. These boats were purchased following donations from American Balliol alumni Jim Rogers.

Training locations
Novice and development crews train on the stretch of the Thames, known as "The Isis" locally, which flows through Oxford, but senior crews train further afield at Abingdon, utilising the facilities of Abingdon Rowing Club.

See also
Balliol College
Torpids
Summer Eights
Oxford University Rowing Clubs
Oxford University Boat Club
British Rowing

References

Bibliography

External links
BCBC website
Oxford University Rowing Clubs
Oxford Bumps Charts

1840 establishments in England
Sports clubs established in the 1840s
Rowing clubs of the University of Oxford
Boat Club
Rowing clubs in Oxfordshire
Rowing clubs of the River Thames